The Gordon E. Moore Medal for Outstanding Achievement in Solid State Science and Technology (formerly the Solid-State Science and Technology Award) was established by The Electrochemical Society in 1971 to recognize individuals distinguished for outstanding contributions to solid-state science and technology. The award is presented every two years, and recipients receive a silver medal, wall plaque, cash prize, Society Life membership, and a complimentary meeting registration.

History 
Despite the fact that the solid-state community represented a major force in The Electrochemical Society, there was no form of recognition at the Society level of achievements in the field prior to the establishment of this award. Known as the Solid-State Science and Technology Award until 2005, the award was then renamed after Intel co-founder and author of Moore's Law, Gordon E. Moore, who is a long-time member of The Electrochemical Society.

Notable Recipients 

As listed by ECS:

 2019 David J. Lockwood
 2015 Yue Kuo
 2005 Dennis Hess
 1999 Isamu Akasaki
 1995 Wayne L. Worrell
 1993 Bruce E. Deal
 1987 Alfred Y. Cho
 1985 Jerry M. Woodall
 1983 Nick Holonyak, Jr.
 1981 Gerald L. Pearson
 1979 Morton B. Panish
 1977 Robert N. Hall
 1973 William G. Pfann

See also

 List of chemistry awards

References

External links 
 Gordon E. Moore Medal Recipients

Materials science awards
Electrochemistry